The Warren White House is a historic house in Waltham, Massachusetts.  The -story wood-frame house was built c. 1850–54, and is the oldest surviving house on Warren Street, once an important thoroughfare between Waltham and Belmont.  The house has classic Italianate styling, with a symmetrical three-bay facade, wide cornerboards and entablature, and round-arched gable windows.  It was built by Warren White, a wheelwright, on land owned by David White, a farmer, who sold Warren White the property in 1855.

The house was listed on the National Register of Historic Places in 1989.

See also
National Register of Historic Places listings in Waltham, Massachusetts

References

Houses in Waltham, Massachusetts
Houses on the National Register of Historic Places in Waltham, Massachusetts
Italianate architecture in Massachusetts
Houses completed in 1850